The Little Giant is a 1926 American silent comedy film directed by William Nigh and starring Glenn Hunter, Edna Murphy, and David Higgins.

Plot
As described in a film magazine review, Elmer Clinton, raised by his Uncle Clem, an old peddler, is made the sales manager of a big washing machine company. He becomes full of an undue sense of his own cleverness, and those around him pander to this self-conceit with flattery. Royce Enfield, the son of the company's owner, plots to ruin him, and all the marketing campaigns are failures. Elmer and his wife Myra do not live within their means and quarrel. Clem sells several washing machines quietly on the side. Elmer discovers that Royce has been double-crossing him and whips him in a fight. Elmer gets rid of the parasitic crowd that had been flattering him, begins marketing and driving up sales based on what Clem had taught him, and is reconciled with his wife.

Cast
 Glenn Hunter as Elmer Clinton 
 Edna Murphy as Myra Clinton 
 David Higgins as Uncle Clem
 James Bradbury Jr. as Brad 
 Jean Jarvis as Olga 
 Leonard Meeker as Royce Enfield
 Louise Mackintosh as Mrs. Dansey 
 Tom McGuire as Mr. Dansey 
 Dodson Mitchell as Mr. Enfield 
 Peter Raymond as Dr. Porter

References

Bibliography
 Munden, Kenneth White. The American Film Institute Catalog of Motion Pictures Produced in the United States, Part 1. University of California Press, 1997.

External links

1926 films
1926 comedy films
Silent American comedy films
American silent feature films
1920s English-language films
Universal Pictures films
Films directed by William Nigh
American black-and-white films
1920s American films